Carlos de Morais Camisão (8 May 1821 – 29 May 1867) was a Brazilian colonel of the Paraguayan War. He was one of the leaders of Laguna, with Alfredo d'Escragnolle Taunay.  He took command of the Brazilian force counter-attacking the Paraguayan invasion during the Mato Grosso Campaign, but died of cholera during the retreat.

Biography
He was born in Rio de Janeiro and died in Jardim.

Awards
He was a Knight of the Order of Christ, since 21 January 1849.
He was an Imperial Knight of the Order of the Rose, since 16 March 1849.
He was a Knight of the Order of Aviz, since 10 July 1860.

References

Brazilian military personnel
1821 births
1867 deaths
Brazilian military personnel of the Paraguayan War